Alastair Neil Robertson Niven  Hon FRSL (born 25 February 1944) is an English literary scholar and author. He has written books on D. H. Lawrence, Raja Rao, and Mulk Raj Anand, and has been Director General of The Africa Centre, Director of Literature at the Arts Council of Great Britain and of the British Council, a principal of Cumberland Lodge, and president of English PEN. In 2021, Niven was chosen as the recipient of the Benson Medal from the Royal Society of Literature, awarded for exceptional contribution to literature.

Education
Born in Edinburgh, Scotland, Niven was educated at Dulwich College in London and at Gonville and Caius College, Cambridge. and was then a Commonwealth Scholar for two years at the University of Ghana, where he "first researched in the field of African literature", receiving his Master's degree and lecturing in English literature there. He next lectured in English literature at the University of Leeds, where he received his Doctorate, and then taught English Studies at Stirling University, where he was given charge of Commonwealth literature.

Scholarship and academic work
In the 1970s, Niven wrote the first of several books. His 1978 study, D. H. Lawrence: The Novels, was reviewed as "an excellent introduction to Lawrence as an artist and as a thinker", and as "particularly useful for its full treatment of the neglected or downgraded novels". Niven's 1980 book, D. H. Lawrence: The Writer and His Work was reviewed in the Los Angeles Times Book Review as "a brief yet substantial commentary on the Lawrence work," though with "few fresh insights." The review noted that Niven "does focus some welcome attention on several less-lauded works," and that Niven's "defense of Lawrence's underrated plays should interest any serious Lawrence scholar."

Niven was Director General of The Africa Centre in London from 1978 to 1984. He was at various times "an executive member of the Association for Commonwealth Literature and Language Studies and a member of the Commonwealth Institute Working Party on Library Holdings of Commonwealth Literature". From 1987 to 1997, he was Director of Literature at the Arts Council of Great Britain, and from 1997 to 2001 was the British Council's director of literature.

Booker Prize work and other literary activities
He was a judge for the Booker Prize in 1994, and for the Man Booker Prize in 2014. In 2017, Niven argued that allowing American authors to contend for the Booker award would not lead to American dominance, pointing to authors from other countries having won recent international literary awards. The following year, he opposed efforts to drop American authors from contention for the Booker Prize. In support of the wide international eligibility of applicants, he described "the development of the English language into a number of different Englishes, which can then be compared and contrasted" as "one of the unifying features of the literature."

In 2000–2001, Niven served on the International Advisory Board of the Raja Rao Award for Literature. He was Principal of the King George VI and Queen Elizabeth Foundation of St. Catherine at Cumberland Lodge in Windsor from 2001 to 2013, and "held the unique double of being Director of Literature at the Arts Council of Great Britain (later Arts Council England) for 10 years and Director of Literature at the British Council for four." He was president of English PEN from 2003 to 2007, and Chairman of the Commonwealth Writers' Prize.

In the 2012 Birthday Honours, Niven was made a Lieutenant of the Royal Victorian Order (LVO), personally conferred by Queen Elizabeth II. He was a jury member for the 2012 DSC Prize for South Asian Literature.

In 2017, he was Chair of Judges for the Saif Ghobash Banipal Prize for Arabic Literary Translation.

In 2019, he supported a fundraiser to preserve an antique annotated copy of D. H. Lawrence's Lady Chatterley's Lover used as an exhibit in the famous obscenity trial, R v Penguin Books Ltd. Having written two books about Lawrence, Niven commented: "He has served me well and the least I can do now is help in his hour of need."

Niven's memoir, In Glad or Sorry Hours, was published in February 2021.

Awards and honours 
 2001: appointed an OBE in New Year Honours List

 2012: appointed a Lieutenant of the Royal Victorian Order (LVO)
 Honorary Fellow of Harris Manchester College, University of Oxford
 2021: elected as an Honorary Fellow of the Royal Society of Literature

 2021: recipient of the Benson Medal from the Royal Society of Literature, for his exceptional contribution to literature

Publications
In addition to his books, Niven "is the author of over fifty articles on aspects of Commonwealth and post-colonial literature, and has also written extensively about the welfare of overseas students".

The Commonwealth Writer Overseas (1976)
D. H. Lawrence: The Novels (1978)
The Yoke of Pity: A Study in the Fictional Writings of Mulk Raj Anand (1978)
D. H. Lawrence, the writer and his work (1980)
Under Another Sky: The Commonwealth Poetry Prize Anthology (1987)
Truth Within Fiction: A study of Raja Rao's The Serpent & the Rope (1987)
Enigmas and Arrivals: An Anthology of Commonwealth Writing (1997)
"Jack Mapanje: A Chameleon in Prison", Poetry Review 80, no. 4 (1990–91): 49–51
In Glad or Sorry Hours, Starhaven Press, 2021,

References

External links
Niven, Alastair (Neil Robertson) biography from Writers Directory 2005 hosted by Encyclopedia.com
Alastair Niven biography from DSC Prize for South Asian Literature
Alastair Niven, LVO, OBE, biography from Harris Manchester College, Oxford

1944 births
Alumni of Gonville and Caius College, Cambridge
Alumni of the University of Leeds
Fellows of Harris Manchester College, Oxford
Lieutenants of the Royal Victorian Order
Living people
Officers of the Order of the British Empire
People associated with the University of Stirling
People educated at Dulwich College
University of Ghana alumni
Writers from Edinburgh
Presidents of the English Centre of PEN